Revealer is the third studio album by American singer Madison Cunningham, released on September 9, 2022 by Verve Forecast. It won the Grammy Award for Best Folk Album in 2023.

Critical reception

In a review for AllMusic, critic Marcy Donelson gave the album 3.5 out of 5 stars, and wrote "diverging in subtle ways from her debut, Revealer's somewhat more adventurous arrangements and spirited lyrics hold a charm of their own."

Track listing

References

External links
 

2022 albums
Americana albums
Grammy Award-winning albums